Langhorn is a surname. Notable people with the surname include:

 Garfield M. Langhorn (1948–1969), United States Army soldier
 George Langhorn (1881–1934), English professional rugby league footballer

See also
 Langhorns, Swedish musical group